"I Hope" is a country–pop song written and performed by the American all-female trio Dixie Chicks for their seventh studio album, Taking the Long Way, in 2006.

It was nominated for two Grammy Awards at the 48th ceremony, but lost in both categories.

Song information
The song, written by all the three band members (Emily Robison, Martie Maguire, Natalie Maines) and Kevin Moore, received its debut performance on the Shelter from the Storm: A Concert for the Gulf Coast telethon on September 9, 2005. It was later made available as a digital download single with proceeds to benefit the Hurricane Katrina relief. The song features a guitar solo from John Mayer.

Comments about the song by band members
This is what band members Robison and Maines commented about the writing process of "I Hope":

Robison: "Kevin was one of the last writers we wrote with, and it was so nice and so comfortable working with him. With what he's been through and where he grew up, it's important to him to write positive, uplifting songs."
Maines: "On the other hand, he wasn't afraid to get political, and this ultimately turned out to be a pretty serious song. Hopeful and positive, but serious."

Chart performance

Awards nominations
48th Grammy Awards:
Best Country Song
Best Country Performance by a Duo or Group with Vocal

References

External links
The Dixie Chicks official website
The Dixie Chicks press room

2005 singles
The Chicks songs
Song recordings produced by Rick Rubin
Songs written by Martie Maguire
Songs written by Emily Robison
Songs written by Natalie Maines
Columbia Records singles